Westervelt is a census-designated place in Shelby County, Illinois, United States. Its population was 131 as of the 2020 census.

History
Westervelt was established in 1904 as a station along the Chicago and Eastern Illinois Railroad, which had recently opened a line through the area. The station drew settlers and businesses from the nearby community of Brunswick, and the new community grew quickly. A 1917 tornado killed six residents and destroyed nine buildings.

The Westervelt Christian Church is listed on the National Register of Historic Places.

Demographics

References

Census-designated places in Shelby County, Illinois
Census-designated places in Illinois